Ātman is a Sanskrit word that refers to the (universal) Self or self-existent essence of individuals, as distinct from ego (Ahamkara), mind (Citta) and embodied existence (Prakṛti). The term is often translated as soul, but is better translated as "Self," as it solely refers to pure consciousness or witness-consciousness, beyond identification with phenomena. In order to attain moksha (liberation), a human being must acquire self-knowledge (Atma Gyaan or Brahmajnana).

Atman is a central concept in the various schools of Indian philosophy, which have different views on the relation between Atman, individual Self (Jīvātman), supreme Self (Paramātmā) and, the Ultimate Reality (Brahman), stating that they are: completely identical (Advaita, Non-Dualist), completely different (Dvaita, Dualist), or simultaneously non-different and different (Bhedabheda, Non-Dualist + Dualist).

The six orthodox schools of Hinduism believe that there is Ātman in every living being (jiva), which is distinct from the body-mind complex. This is a major point of difference with the Buddhist doctrine of Anatta, which holds that in essence there is no unchanging essence or Self to be found in the empirical constituents of a living being, staying silent on what it is that is liberated.

Etymology and meaning

Etymology
Ātman (Atma, आत्मा, आत्मन्) is a Sanskrit word that refers to "essence, breath." It is derived from the Proto-Indo-European word  (a root meaning "breath" with Germanic cognates:  Dutch adem, Old High German atum "breath," Modern German atmen "to breathe" and Atem "respiration, breath", Old English eþian).

Ātman, sometimes spelled without a diacritic as atman in scholarly literature, means "real Self" of the individual, "innermost essence." While often translated as "soul," it is better translated as "self."

Meaning
In Hinduism, Atman refers to the self-existent essence of human beings, the observing pure consciousness or witness-consciousness as exemplified by the Purusha of Samkhya. It is distinct from the ever-evolving embodied individual being (jivanatman) embedded in material reality, exemplified by the prakriti of Samkhya, and characterized by Ahamkara (ego, non-spiritual psychological I-ness Me-ness), mind (citta, manas), and all the defiling kleshas (habits, prejudices, desires, impulses, delusions, fads, behaviors, pleasures, sufferings and fears). Embodied personality and Ahamkara shift, evolve or change with time,  while Atman doesn't. It is "pure, undifferentiated, self-shining consciousness."

As such, it is different from non-Hindu notions of soul, which includes consciousness but also the mental abilities of a living being, such as reason, character, feeling, consciousness, memory, perception and thinking. In Hinduism, these are all included in embodied reality, the counterpart of Atman.

Atman, in Hinduism, is considered as eternal, imperishable, beyond time, "not the same as body or mind or consciousness, but... something beyond which permeates all these". Atman is the unchanging, eternal, innermost radiant Self that is unaffected by personality, unaffected by ego; Atman is that which is ever-free, never-bound, the realized purpose, meaning, liberation in life. As Puchalski states, "the ultimate goal of Hindu religious life is to transcend individuality, to realize one's own true nature", the inner essence of oneself, which is divine and pure.

Development of the concept

Vedas
The earliest use of the word Ātman in Indian texts is found in the Rig Veda (RV X.97.11). Yāska, the ancient Indian grammarian, commenting on this Rigvedic verse, accepts the following meanings of Ātman: the pervading principle, the organism in which other elements are united and the ultimate sentient principle.

Other hymns of Rig Veda where the word Ātman appears include I.115.1, VII.87.2, VII.101.6, VIII.3.24, IX.2.10, IX.6.8, and X.168.4.

Upanishads
Ātman is a central topic in all of the Upanishads, and "know your Ātman" is one of their thematic foci. The Upanishads say that Atman denotes "the ultimate essence of the universe" as well as "the vital breath in human beings", which is "imperishable Divine within" that is neither born nor does it die. Cosmology and psychology are indistinguishable, and these texts state that the core of every person's Self is not the body, nor the mind, nor the ego, but Ātman. The Upanishads express two distinct, somewhat divergent themes on the relation between Atman and Brahman. Some teach that Brahman (highest reality; universal principle; being-consciousness-bliss) is identical with Ātman, while others teach that Ātman is part of Brahman but not identical to it. This ancient debate flowered into various dual and non-dual theories in Hinduism. The Brahmasutra by Badarayana (~100 BCE) synthesized and unified these somewhat conflicting theories, stating that Atman and Brahman are different in some respects, particularly during the state of ignorance, but at the deepest level and in the state of self-realization, Atman and Brahman are identical, non-different (advaita). According to Koller, this synthesis countered the dualistic tradition of Samkhya-Yoga schools and realism-driven traditions of Nyaya-Vaiseshika schools, enabling it to become the foundation of Vedanta as Hinduism's most influential spiritual tradition.

Brihadaranyaka Upanishad
The Brihadaranyaka Upanishad (800-600 BCE) describes Atman as that in which everything exists, which is of the highest value, which permeates everything, which is the essence of all, bliss and beyond description. In hymn 4.4.5, Brihadaranyaka Upanishad describes Atman as Brahman, and associates it with everything one is, everything one can be, one's free will, one's desire, what one does, what one doesn't do, the good in oneself, the bad in oneself.

This theme of Ātman, that the essence and Self of every person and being is the same as Brahman, is extensively repeated in Brihadāranyaka Upanishad. The Upanishad asserts that this knowledge of "I am Brahman", and that there is no difference between "I" and "you", or "I" and "him" is a source of liberation, and not even gods can prevail over such a liberated man. For example, in hymn 1.4.10,

Chandogya Upanishad
The Chandogya Upanishad (7th-6th c. BCE) explains Ātman as that which appears to be separate between two living beings but isn't, that essence and innermost, true, radiant self of all individuals which connects and unifies all.  Hymn 6.10 explains it with the example of rivers, some of which flow to the east and some to the west, but ultimately all merge into the ocean and become one. In the same way, the individual souls are pure being, states the Chandogya Upanishad; an individual soul is pure truth, and an individual soul is a manifestation of the ocean of one universal soul.

Katha Upanishad
Along with the Brihadāranyaka, all the earliest and middle Upanishads discuss Ātman as they build their theories to answer how man can achieve liberation, freedom and bliss. The Katha Upanishad  (5th to 1st century BCE), for example, explains Atman as the imminent and transcendent innermost essence of each human being and living creature, that this is one, even though the external forms of living creatures manifest in different forms.  For example, hymn 2.2.9 states,

Katha Upanishad, in Book 1, hymns 3.3 to 3.4, describes the widely cited proto-Samkhya analogy of chariot for the relation of "Soul, Self" to body, mind and senses. Stephen Kaplan translates these hymns as, "Know the Self as the rider in a chariot, and the body as simply the chariot. Know the intellect as the charioteer, and the mind as the reins. The senses, they say are the horses, and sense objects are the paths around them". The Katha Upanishad then declares that "when the Self [Ātman] understands this and is unified, integrated with body, senses and mind, is virtuous, mindful and pure, he reaches bliss, freedom and liberation".

Indian philosophy

Orthodox schools

Atman is a metaphysical and spiritual concept for Hindus, often discussed in their scriptures with the concept of Brahman. All major orthodox schools of Hinduism – Samkhya, Yoga, Nyaya, Vaisesika, Mimamsa, and Vedanta – accept the foundational premise of the Vedas and Upanishads that "Ātman exists." In Hindu philosophy, especially in the Vedanta school of Hinduism, Ātman is the first principle. Jainism too accepts this premise, although it has its own idea of what that means. In contrast, both Buddhism and the Charvakas deny that there is anything called "Ātman/soul/self".

Samkhya

In Samkhya, the oldest school of Hinduism, Puruṣa, the witness-consciousness, is Atman. It is absolute, independent, free, imperceptible, unknowable through other agencies, above any experience by mind or senses and beyond any words or explanations. It remains pure, "nonattributive consciousness". Puruṣa is neither produced nor does it produce. No appellations can qualify purusha, nor can it substantialized or objectified. It "cannot be reduced, can't be 'settled'." Any designation of purusha comes from prakriti, and is a limitation. Unlike Advaita Vedanta, and like Purva-Mīmāṃsā, Samkhya believes in plurality of the puruṣas.

Samkhya considers ego (asmita, ahamkara) to be the cause of pleasure and pain. Self-knowledge is the means to attain kaivalya, the separation of Atman from the body-mind complex.

Yoga philosophy
The Yogasutra of Patanjali, the foundational text of Yoga school of Hinduism, mentions Atma in multiple verses, and particularly in its last book, where Samadhi is described as the path to self-knowledge and kaivalya. Some earlier mentions of Atman in Yogasutra include verse 2.5, where evidence of ignorance includes "confusing what is not Atman as Atman".

In verses 2.19-2.20, Yogasutra declares that pure ideas are the domain of Atman, the perceivable universe exists to enlighten Atman, but while Atman is pure, it may be deceived by complexities of perception or mind. These verses also set the purpose of all experience as a means to self-knowledge.

In Book 4, Yogasutra states spiritual liberation as the stage where the yogin achieves distinguishing self-knowledge, he no longer confuses his mind as Atman, the mind is no longer affected by afflictions or worries of any kind, ignorance vanishes, and "pure consciousness settles in its own pure nature".

The Yoga school is similar to the Samkhya school in its conceptual foundations of Ātman. It is the self that is discovered and realized in the Kaivalya state, in both schools. Like Samkhya, this is not a single universal Ātman. It is one of the many individual selves where each "pure consciousness settles in its own pure nature", as a unique distinct soul/self. However, Yoga school's methodology was widely influential on other schools of Hindu philosophy. Vedanta monism, for example, adopted Yoga as a means to reach Jivanmukti – self-realization in this life – as conceptualized in Advaita Vedanta. Yoga and Samkhya define Ātman as an "unrelated, attributeless, self-luminous, omnipresent entity", which is identical with consciousness.

Nyaya
Early atheistic Nyaya scholars, and later theistic Nyaya scholars, both made substantial contributions to the systematic study of Ātman. They posited that even though "self" is intimately related to the knower, it can still be the subject of knowledge. John Plott states that the Nyaya scholars developed a theory of negation that far exceeds Hegel's theory of negation, while their epistemological theories refined to "know the knower" at least equals Aristotle's sophistication. Nyaya methodology influenced all major schools of Hinduism.

The Nyaya scholars defined Ātman as an imperceptible substance that is the substrate of human consciousness, manifesting itself with or without qualities such as desires, feelings, perception, knowledge, understanding, errors, insights, sufferings, bliss, and others. Nyaya school not only developed its theory of Atman, it contributed to Hindu philosophy in a number of ways. To the Hindu theory of Ātman, the contributions of Nyaya scholars were twofold. One, they went beyond holding it as "self evident" and offered rational proofs, consistent with their epistemology, in their debates with Buddhists, that "Atman exists". Second, they developed theories on what "Atman is and is not". As proofs for the proposition 'self exists', for example, Nyaya scholars argued that personal recollections and memories of the form "I did this so many years ago" implicitly presume that there is a self that is substantial, continuing, unchanged, and existent.

Nyayasutra, a 2nd-century CE foundational text of Nyaya school of Hinduism, states that Atma is a proper object of human knowledge. It also states that Atman is a real substance that can be inferred from certain signs, objectively perceivable attributes. For example, in book 1, chapter 1, verses 9 and 10, Nyayasutra states

Book 2, chapter 1, verses 1 to 23, of the Nyayasutras posits that the sensory act of looking is different from perception and cognition–that perception and knowledge arise from the seekings and actions of Ātman. The Naiyayikas emphasize that Ātman has qualities, but is different from its qualities. For example, desire is one of many qualities of Ātman, but Ātman does not always have desire, and in the state of liberation, for instance, the Ātman is without desire.

Vaiśeṣika
The Vaisheshika school of Hinduism, using its non-theistic theories of atomistic naturalism, posits that Ātman is one of the four eternal non-physical substances without attributes, the other three being kala (time), dik (space) and manas (mind). Time and space, stated Vaiśeṣika scholars, are eka (one), nitya (eternal) and vibhu (all pervading). Time and space are indivisible reality, but human mind prefers to divide them to comprehend past, present, future, relative place of other substances and beings, direction and its own coordinates in the universe. In contrast to these characteristics of time and space, Vaiśeṣika scholars considered Ātman to be many, eternal, independent and spiritual substances that cannot be reduced or inferred from other three non-physical and five physical dravya (substances). Mind and sensory organs are instruments, while consciousness is the domain of "atman, soul, self".

The knowledge of Ātman, to Vaiśeṣika Hindus, is another knowledge without any "bliss" or "consciousness" moksha state that Vedanta and Yoga school describe.

Mimamsa
Ātman, in the ritualism-based Mīmāṃsā school of Hinduism, is an eternal, omnipresent, inherently active essence that is identified as I-consciousness. Unlike all other schools of Hinduism, Mimamsaka scholars considered ego and Atman as the same. Within Mimamsa school, there was divergence of beliefs. Kumārila, for example, believed that Atman is the object of I-consciousness, whereas Prabhakara believed that Atman is the subject of I-consciousness. Mimamsaka Hindus believed that what matters is virtuous actions and rituals completed with perfection, and it is this that creates merit and imprints knowledge on Atman, whether one is aware or not aware of Atman. Their foremost emphasis was formulation and understanding of laws/duties/virtuous life (dharma) and consequent perfect execution of kriyas (actions). The Upanishadic discussion of Atman, to them, was of secondary importance. While other schools disagreed and discarded the Atma theory of Mimamsa, they incorporated Mimamsa theories on ethics, self-discipline, action, and dharma as necessary in one's journey toward knowing one's Atman.

Vedanta

Advaita Vedanta
Advaita Vedanta (non-dualism) sees the "spirit/soul/self" within each living entity as being fully identical with Brahman. The Advaita school believes that there is one soul that connects and exists in all living beings, regardless of their shapes or forms, and there is no distinction, no superior, no inferior, no separate devotee soul (Atman), no separate god soul (Brahman). The oneness unifies all beings, there is divine in every being, and that all existence is a single reality, state the Advaita Vedanta Hindus. In contrast, devotional sub-schools of Vedanta such as Dvaita (dualism) differentiate between the individual Atma in living beings, and the supreme Atma (Paramatma) as being separate.

Advaita Vedanta philosophy considers Atman as self-existent awareness, limitless and non-dual. To Advaitins, the Atman is the Brahman, the Brahman is the Atman, each self is non-different from the infinite. Atman is the universal principle, one eternal undifferentiated self-luminous consciousness, the truth asserts Advaita Hinduism. Human beings, in a state of unawareness of this universal self, see their "I-ness" as different from the being in others, then act out of impulse, fears, cravings, malice, division, confusion, anxiety, passions, and a sense of distinctiveness. To Advaitins, Atman-knowledge is the state of full awareness, liberation, and freedom that overcomes dualities at all levels, realizing the divine within oneself, the divine in others, and in all living beings; the non-dual oneness, that God is in everything, and everything is God. This identification of individual living beings/souls, or jiva-atmas, with the 'one Atman' is the non-dualistic Advaita Vedanta position.

Dvaita Vedanta 
The monist, non-dual conception of existence in Advaita Vedanta is not accepted by the dualistic/theistic Dvaita Vedanta. Dvaita Vedanta calls the Atman of a supreme being as Paramatman, and holds it to be different from individual Atman. Dvaita scholars assert that God is the ultimate, complete, perfect, but distinct soul, one that is separate from incomplete, imperfect jivas (individual souls). The Advaita sub-school believes that self-knowledge leads to liberation in this life, while the Dvaita sub-school believes that liberation is only possible in after-life as communion with God, and only through the grace of God (if not, then one's Atman is reborn). God created individual souls, state Dvaita Vedantins, but the individual soul never was and never will become one with God; the best it can do is to experience bliss by getting infinitely close to God. The Dvaita school, therefore, in contrast to the monistic position of Advaita, advocates a version of monotheism wherein Brahman is made synonymous with Vishnu (or Narayana), distinct from numerous individual Atmans.

Buddhism

Applying the disidentification of 'no-self' to the logical end, Buddhism does not assert an unchanging essence, any "eternal, essential and absolute something called a soul, self or atman," According to Jayatilleke, the Upanishadic inquiry fails to find an empirical correlate of the assumed Atman, but nevertheless assumes its existence, and, states Mackenzie, Advaitins "reify consciousness as an eternal self." In contrast, the Buddhist inquiry "is satisfied with the empirical investigation which shows that no such Atman exists because there is no evidence" states Jayatilleke.

While Nirvana is liberation from the kleshas and the disturbances of the mind-body complex, Buddhism eludes a definition of what it is that is liberated. According to Johannes Bronkhorst, "it is possible that original Buddhism did not deny the existence of soul," but did not want to talk about it, as they could not say that "the soul is essentially not involved in action, as their opponents did." While the skandhas are regarded is impermanent (anatman) and sorrowfull (dukkha), the existence of a permanent, joyful and unchanging self is neither acknowledged nor explicitly denied. Liberation is not attained by knowledge of such a self, but by " turning away from what might erroneously be regarded as the self."

According to Harvey, in Buddhism the negation of temporal existents is applied even more rigorously than in the Upanishads:

Nevertheless, Atman-like notions can also be found in Buddhist texts chronologically placed in the 1st millennium of the Common Era, such as the Mahayana tradition's Tathāgatagarbha sūtras suggest self-like concepts, variously called Tathagatagarbha or Buddha nature. In the Theravada tradition, the Dhammakaya Movement in Thailand teaches that it is erroneous to subsume nirvana under the rubric of anatta (non-self); instead, nirvana is taught to be the "true self" or dhammakaya. Similar interpretations have been put forth by the then Thai Sangharaja in 1939. According to Williams, the Sangharaja's interpretation echoes the tathāgatagarbha sutras.

The notion of Buddha-nature is controversial, and "eternal self" concepts have been vigorously attacked. These "self-like" concepts are neither self nor sentient being, nor soul, nor personality. Some scholars posit that the Tathagatagarbha Sutras were written to promote Buddhism to non-Buddhists. The Dhammakaya Movement teaching that nirvana is atta (atman) has been criticized as heretical in Buddhism by Prayudh Payutto, a well-known scholar monk, who added that 'Buddha taught nibbana as being non-self". This dispute on the nature of teachings about 'self' and 'non-self' in Buddhism has led to arrest warrants, attacks and threats.

Influence of Atman-concept on Hindu ethics

The Atman theory in Upanishads had a profound impact on ancient ethical theories and dharma traditions now known as Hinduism. The earliest Dharmasutras of Hindus recite Atman theory from the Vedic texts and Upanishads, and on its foundation build precepts of dharma, laws and ethics. Atman theory, particularly the Advaita Vedanta and Yoga versions, influenced the emergence of the theory of Ahimsa (non-violence against all creatures), culture of vegetarianism, and other theories of ethical, dharmic life.

Dharma-sutras
The Dharmasutras and Dharmasastras integrate the teachings of Atman theory. Apastamba Dharmasutra, the oldest known Indian text on dharma, for example, titles Chapters 1.8.22 and 1.8.23 as "Knowledge of the Atman" and then recites,

Ahimsa
The ethical prohibition against harming any human beings or other living creatures (Ahimsa, अहिंसा), in Hindu traditions, can be traced to the Atman theory. This precept against injuring any living being appears together with Atman theory in hymn 8.15.1 of Chandogya Upanishad (ca. 8th century BCE), then becomes central in the texts of Hindu philosophy, entering the dharma codes of ancient Dharmasutras and later era Manu-Smriti. Ahimsa theory is a natural corollary and consequence of "Atman is universal oneness, present in all living beings. Atman connects and prevades in everyone. Hurting or injuring another being is hurting the Atman, and thus one's self that exists in another body". This conceptual connection between one's Atman, the universal, and Ahimsa starts in Isha Upanishad, develops in the theories of the ancient scholar Yajnavalkya, and one which inspired Gandhi as he led non-violent movement against colonialism in early 20th century.

Similarities with Greek philosophy
The Atman concept and its discussions in Hindu philosophy parallel with psuchê (soul) and its discussion in ancient Greek philosophy. Eliade notes that there is a capital difference, with schools of Hinduism asserting that liberation of Atman implies "self-knowledge" and "bliss". Similarly, the self-knowledge conceptual theme of Hinduism (Atman jnana) parallels the "know thyself" conceptual theme of Greek philosophy. Max Müller summarized it thus,

See also
 Ātman (Buddhism)
 Ātman (Jainism)
 Ishvara
 Jiva (Hinduism)
 Jnana
 Moksha
 Spirit
 Tat tvam asi
 Tree of Jiva and Atman

Notes

References

Sources

Printed sources

 
 
 

 
 
 

 
 

 

 

 J. Ganeri (2013), The Concealed Art of the Soul, Oxford University Press, 
 

 
 
 

 
 

 
 

 
 

 
 
 
 

 

 
 

 
 
 

 
 

Web-sources

External links
 A. S. Woodburne (1925), The Idea of God in Hinduism, The Journal of Religion, Vol. 5, No. 1 (Jan., 1925), pages 52–66
 K. L. Seshagiri Rao (1970), On Truth: A Hindu Perspective, Philosophy East and West, Vol. 20, No. 4 (Oct., 1970), pages 377-382
 Norman E. Thomas (1988), Liberation for Life: A Hindu Liberation Philosophy, Missiology, Vol. 16, No. 2, pages 149-162

Conceptions of self
Hindu philosophical concepts
Spirituality